Tubex may refer to:
 Tubex (syringe cartridge)
 Adrenocorticotropic hormone, by trade name Tubex